Ecdytolopha insiticiana, the locust twig borer is a moth of the family Tortricidae. It is found in North America, including Pennsylvania, Iowa, West Virginia, Arkansas, Massachusetts, New York and Ontario.

The wingspan is 20–25 mm. Adults are on wing from  May to August.

The larvae feed on Robinia pseudoacacia. The larvae feed within the stem pith of seedlings, stump sprouts and new stem growth of older trees.

External links
 Bug Guide
 "Parasitoids Reared from the Locust Twig Borer, Ecdytolopha insiticiana Zell. (Lepidoptera: Tortricidae) in southeastern Kentucky"
 Images

Olethreutinae
Moths described in 1875